Hayat Abdullayeva (14 October 1912, Derbent - 21 April 2006, Baku) - an Azerbaijani sculptor, and honoured art worker.

Biography 
Hayat Hamdulla qizi Abdullayeva was born on 14 October 1912 in the city of Derbent. She was the daughter of the famous fish merchant Hamdulla Abdullayev. After the execution of her father, she was exiled with her mother to Kazakhstan. 

In 1942, she entered the evacuated Repin Institute of Painting, Sculpture and Architecture (now Repin Institute of Arts), from Leningrad to Samarkand. In those years, she created the sculptures "Tutu khanim" and "Hasan bey Zardabi". She became the first Azerbaijani woman in the field of easel sculpture. After completing her studies, she arrived to Baku, where she was a teacher at the Art School named after Azim Azimzada. She learned in the workshop of artist Petr Sabsay.

Creation 
Abdullayeva worked in the decorative and easel sculpture field. The lyrical theme prevailed in Abdullayevas small sculptures. If in such compositions as "Motherhood" and "Lullaby", the sculptor sings maternal love, then she dedicates her two-figure sculpture to the enamoured. The poetic images of a guy and a girl made of wood, contemplating the world of love, dreams, and desires, convey a feeling of tenderness.

Among the famous works of the author, one can note the sculpture "Hajar" (1959), the colourful decorative figures reflecting the characters from Nizamis poem "Seven Beauties"(1959). Sometimes this composition, being represented by porcelain figurines, is called the “Seven Beauties and Bahram Shah”. Despite the diverse images of the girls, that differ in movements and clothes, the author managed to create a whole composition. The artistic images of the poet Nizami Ganjavi, famous in the East, performed by Abdullayeva, received a new and original interpretation. The theme, to which the author turned, itself forces the sculptor to emphasize the brilliance and exoticism of this image. At the same time, the professional flair, the knowledge of the technological qualities of the porcelain, the emanating from the nature and textured capabilities of the material, gave an impetus to the emergence of this decorative composition. The figures attract not only by their plasticity, but also by their logical completeness from the point of view of the typical elements expressions.

The 50s of the last century were fruitful for Abdullayeva in the field of the small plastic genre. The caricature of "Meshedi Ibad" and his aunt from the operetta "Arshin Mal Alan" revealed the decorative talent of the sculptor as well as the ability to express the figurative composition of the depicted face. The types from the "Seven Beauties", the "Talysh Gizi", the "Girl Weaving a Basket", the "Woman with a Child", and other small-volume porcelain and ceramic figures, are the first examples of the authors defining creative prospects, and the ceramic works of the "Seven Beauties" and the "Woman with a child" speak about the breadth of Hayat Abdullayevas creative possibilities. Such works as "Lullaby", "Youth", "Hajar" (walnut tree), in their lyricism, are not inferior to the above-mentioned ones. The professionalism prevailing in these sculptures is reflected in her subsequent works, among which should be noted the sculpture "Without You" - a girl in a raincoat with a raised collar and hands in her pockets conveying a sad mood. Another sculpture by the master, dedicated to the partisan doctor Alia Rustamova, who fought in the forests of Smolensk during the World War II, conveys the pensive image of the heroine. Another sculpture by Hayat Abdullayeva called "The Game" is interesting from a compositional point of view. It represents a girl at the chessboard in a very interesting way. The long flexible neck and the unfinished arms give the work a special charm. At the same time, the main goal for the sculptor is to convey the inner world of the heroine, for whom the game of chess has turned into a thought about the game of life.

Over the years of her creative activity, Abdullayeva has also created a number of major works, including the sculpture of Maxim Gorky, installed on the pediment of the National Library named after M. F. Akhundov, the bronze sculptures of the famous actor Huseyngulu Sarabsky, of the statesman and poet Shah Ismail Khatai, the monument-busts of Khurshidbanu Natavan and the one of the poet Vagif in the city of Shusha.

In 1964, she was awarded the title of the Honored Art Worker.

Abdullayeva died on 21 April 2006 in Baku.

Heritage 
In 2014, the Nizami Cinema Centre in Baku hosted the premiere of a documentary film by the Azerbaijani director Yaver Rzayev "The Light of My Eyes and the Amazing Life of a Sculptor", dedicated to the 100th anniversary of H. Abdullayeva.

See also 
 List of Azerbaijani women artists
 Zivar Mammadova
 Elmira Hüseynova
 Munavvar Rzayeva

References 

1912 births
2006 deaths
Azerbaijani sculptors
Azerbaijani women sculptors
20th-century Azerbaijani women artists
Honored Art Workers of the Azerbaijan SSR
Soviet sculptors
People from Derbent